Strewing herbs are certain kinds of plants that are scattered (strewn) over the floors of dwelling places and other buildings. Such plants usually have fragrant or astringent smells, and many also serve as insecticides or disinfectants. Their use was widespread in England during the Middle Ages through to the 18th century.

Historical use

In the early Middle Ages, bathing had declined in England. As people got smellier, the use of fragrant herbs became more popular. They were used in all areas of the house, including kitchens, dining halls and bedrooms. The herbs were laid on the floor along with reeds, rushes, or straw, so that pleasant odours would be released when people walked on them. Certain plants would also help keep pests such as fleas at bay. In a typical medieval English monastery, for instance, the floor of the dormitory would have been strewn with rushes that were swept and replaced once or twice a year.

Rich and poor households used strewing herbs and royal households were no exception. Indeed, Queen Elizabeth I was particularly fond of meadowsweet (Filipendula ulmaria):

The post of Royal Herb Strewer was created in 1660 by King Charles II.

List of strewing herbs

References

Herbs